Andrey Anatolyevich Turchak (born 20 December 1975) is a Russian politician who has served Secretary of the General Council of United Russia from 12 October 2017 and the Senator from Pskov Oblast from 2 November 2017.

Previously, he was the fifth Governor of Pskov Oblast (2009–2017) and Senator from the Pskov Oblast (2007–2009). By being appointed as Governor at the age of 33, he became one of Russia's youngest governors.

In 2013, Alexei Navalny released documents showing that Turchak had neglected to declare a $1.7 million villa that he had purchased in France, an illegal omission under Russian law.  

In 2015, reporter Oleg Kashin accused Turchak of ordering an attack which left Kashin in a coma with a fractured skull. Kashin alleged that Turchak arranged the attack in response to a critical blog post.

Turchak has been an ardent supporter of Vladimir Putin. In March 2022, Turchak accused former Russian Vice Premier and current President of FIDE Arkady Dvorkovich of 'national betrayal' and called for his “immediate dismissal in disgrace”, saying: "This is nothing but the very national betrayal, the behavior of the fifth column, which the president [of Russia] spoke about today”, after Dvorkovich had criticized the 2022 Russian invasion of Ukraine and said his thoughts are 'with Ukrainian civilians'.

In early May 2022, Turchak visited the Russian-occupied city of Mariupol, taking part in the unveiling of a statue of the old woman holding the Soviet flag.

In May 2022, he visited occupied Kherson and said: "I would like, once again, to say to residents of the Kherson region that Russia is here forever. There should be no doubt about that." Ukrainian forces recaptured Kherson in early November 2022. 

In July 2022, Turchak visited the eastern Ukrainian city of Kupiansk, which had recently been captured by Russian troops. “Clearly, Russia is here forever,” Turchak said, speaking to the camera. Ukrainian forces recaptured Kupiansk in early September 2022.

On 7 September 2022, Turchak stated that it "would be right and symbolic" to hold the annexation referendums in Russian-occupied Ukraine on 4 November, Russia's Unity Day.

References

External links
 Официальный сайт

Living people
1975 births
Politicians from Saint Petersburg
Our Home – Russia politicians
United Russia politicians
Russian nationalists
Russian conspiracy theorists
Anti-Ukrainian sentiment in Russia
21st-century Russian politicians
Members of the Federation Council of Russia (after 2000)
Governors of Pskov Oblast
Russian individuals subject to European Union sanctions